John McIntyre (born April 1, 1963) is an American animator, writer, director, and storyboard artist.

Film and television

References

External links

American male artists
1954 births
American male writers
Place of birth missing (living people)
American directors
Living people
American animators
American animated film directors